In (polyhedral) geometry, a flag is a sequence of faces of a polytope, each contained in the next, with exactly one face from each dimension. 

These latter two are called improper faces.

For example, a flag of a polyhedron comprises one vertex, one edge incident to that vertex, and one polygonal face incident to both, plus the two improper faces.

A polytope may be regarded as regular if, and only if, its symmetry group is transitive on its flags. This definition excludes chiral polytopes.

Incidence geometry
In the more abstract setting of incidence geometry, which is a set having a symmetric and reflexive relation called incidence defined on its elements, a flag is a set of elements that are mutually incident. This level of abstraction generalizes both the polyhedral concept given above as well as the related flag concept from linear algebra.

A flag is maximal if it is not contained in a larger flag. An incidence geometry (Ω) has rank  if Ω can be partitioned into sets Ω1, Ω2, ..., Ω, such that each maximal flag of the geometry intersects each of these sets in exactly one element. In this case, the elements of set Ω are called elements of type .

Consequently, in a geometry of rank , each maximal flag has exactly  elements.

An incidence geometry of rank 2 is commonly called an incidence structure with elements of type 1 called points and elements of type 2 called blocks (or lines in some situations). More formally,

Notes

References 
 
 Peter R. Cromwell, Polyhedra, Cambridge University Press 1997, 
 Peter McMullen, Egon Schulte, Abstract Regular Polytopes, Cambridge University Press, 2002. 

Incidence geometry
Polygons
Polyhedra
4-polytopes